Bible Ki Kahaniyan (English: Stories from the Bible) is an Indian Hindi-language television program based upon scriptures from the Bible. The production aspired to complete both Old Testament and New Testament narratives of the Bible but was later discontinued after covering the Patriarch narrative in the Book of Genesis. It was produced by Appachan through his Navodaya Studio and was broadcast on DD National from 1992 to mid 1993 and again, concluding with the remaining episodes, in 1996.

Premise
The series follows these narrative arcs from the Bible:
 Adam & Eve
 Noah's Ark
 Tower of Babel
 Story of Abraham
 Story of Isaac
 Story of Jacob

Cast

Lalit Tiwari as  Narrator
Arvind Mehra as Voice of God
Mother Teresa as Herself(Regarding the episode about Noah's ark)
Daman Maan as Adam
 Soham as Eve
Varun Vardhan as Cain
 Rajesh Kapoor as Abel
Raza Murad as Noah
Asha Sharma as Noah's wife
Leela Panicker
Urmila Matondkar as Noah's wife's niece
Kothuku Nanappan
Shammi Kapoor as Nimrod
Jagannathan as Manokh
Misha as Aman
Sneha as Nimrod's wife
Kabir Bedi as Abraham
Radha Seth as Sarah
Anamika as Hagar
Surendra Pal as Eliezer
Raja Bundela as Lot
Vishwajeet Pradhan as Nimuk
Seshad Khan as Ishmael
Akbar Khan as Amorite/Main priest
Karan Saluja as King of Sodom/Bethuel
Bhushan Banmali as Hittite
Ravi Vaswani/Rajendra Gupta as Laban
Mohan Gokhale/Kurush Deboo as Isaac
Mita Vashisht/Neelima Azeem as Rebecca
Rita Bhaduri as Deborah
Kanwaljit as Jacob
Salil Shukla as Young Jacob
Janak Toprani as Esau
Master Patnaik as Young Esau
Satish Kapoor as Abimelech
Vijay Mehta as Phicol
Virendra Saxena as Ahusat
Sanofar as Altamash
Aruna Sangal as Cannanite priestess
Ketan Merchant/Prince George as Hittite kids
Winnie Paranjpe as Leah
Sunila Karambelkar as Rachel
Vasudev Bhatt as Ibduil
Tamara George as Bilhah
Chanda as Zilpah
Saba as Laban's wife
Aakash Chopra as Reuben

Background and production
Jijo, the series' creative director, based his chief reference point on novelist James Michener's The Source, a book that talks about the "pains and passions of the people in Biblical times". Casting was done by Anant Mahadevan and Meenakshi Thakkur and the characters were played by some of the important actors from Bollywood. Much of the production work was done by people from the Malayalam film industry based in the state of Kerala. Indian historian George Menachery served as the research director, Sabu Cyril was the art director and Sunny Joseph worked on title photography, with additional cinematography by Ashok Kumar, the series had H. Sridhar as a music recordist, SL Puram Anand was the production executive, and Muthuraj served as an assistant art director. Editing work was done on Avid Media Composer and the series was shot on Kodak Super 16. Post-production was handled by Prasad Studios and Seventh Channel Communications.

Filming and locations 

The series was shot on different locations in India per the narrative arcs: Kallar and Kanyakumari (Adam and Eve), Kanyakumari (Noah's Ark); episodes beginning with Patriarch arc which required desert scenery were shot in the state of Rajasthan (home of the Thar Desert) mainly in Pushkar and Ajmer; and Tirunelveli in Tamil Nadu (Abraham). The shooting was supported by organisations such as the Kerala Forest and Wildlife Department, Rajasthan Tourism Development Corporation, Ajmer Military School among others and received production assistance from the Government of Israel, Israeli Antiquities Authority, Indian Ministry of Foreign Affairs, and N. Ram of The Hindu. Animals required for the Noah's Ark sequence were provided by Bharat Circus.

Research 
Additional people credited and referred to for research work on the Patriarch episodes included Bishop Alphonsus Mathias of the CBCI, Antony Padiyara, Aharon Megged, Asher Weill, T. Carmi, Amihai Mazar, Jack Sasson, Avraham Biran, David Ussishkin, Trudi Dothan, R.J. Zwi Werblowsky, Nissim Ezekiel, Dom Moraes, Leela Naidu.

These institutions were also credited: Bible Lands Museum, Biblical Archaeology Society, British Council - Madras, Connemara Public Library, Eretz Israel Museum, Film Institute - Tel Aviv, Hebrew University, Indian Theosophical Society Library, Jawaharlal Nehru University Library, Jnana Deepa Institute for Philosophy and Theology, Orthodox Theological Seminary - Kottayam, Ratan Tata Library, Reader's Digest Association, National Centre for the Performing Arts, National Georgaphic Society, Steven Spielberg Jewish Film Archive, Israel Museum, and the University of Madras.

Sources consulted 

Books
A number of religious texts and scholarly sources were consulted for the Patriarch episodes, these included:

Articles

Articles referred to in the production of the Patriarch episodes included:

National Geographic
 "Journey into the Living World of the Bible" by Melville Bell Grosvenor  (Oct 1967)
 "Splendors of the Bronze Age" by George F. Bass (Dec 1987)
 "Bringing Old Testament Times to Life" by G. Ernest Wright (Dec 1957)

Bible Review/Biblical Archaeology Review
 "The Mothers of Israel" by J. Cheryl Exum (Spring 1986)
 "Patriarchal Burial Site Explored for First Time in 700 Years" by Nancy Miller (May–June 1985)
 "Ekron of the Philistines" by Trude Dothan and Seymour Gitin (Jan/Feb 1990)
 "Elie Borowswki Seeks a Home for his Collection" by Hershel Shanks (Mar/Apr 1985)
 "Exploring Philistine Origins on the Island of Cyprus" by Vassos Karageorghis (Mar/Apr 1984)
 "Jacob Takes his Bride" by Thomas Mann (Spring 1986)

Music

The Patriarch episodes had lyrics written by Kaifi Azmi and Hasan Kamaal with songs sung by Kavita Krishnamurti, Vinod Rathod, Suresh Wadkar, and Vani Jairam. These episodes included recreated Hurrian songs by Anne Draffkorn Kilmer, and Ancient Greek music by Gregorio Paniagua. Music from "The Music of the Bible Revealed, Tapes and the Book" by Suzanne Haïk-Vantoura, and "The Rise of Ancient Israel" by the Biblical Archaeology Society was also included in these episodes with Vantoura also serving as an advisor.

Broadcast and release

Broadcast 
The first Episode "Adam and Eve" aired on 20 December 1992 on DD National. DD discontinued the series after few episodes because there was fear of communal tension as some people, particularly in Jammu and Kashmir, had objections with the portrayal of Islamic prophets on screen.

Home media 
A 4 disk set of Bible Ki Kahaniyan was released on DVD by Indus Video in the NTSC standard, containing all six episodes of the series that were broadcast by Doordarshan.

See also
 Christianity in India
 Dayasagar
 List of Christian films
 List of films based on the Bible
 List of programs broadcast by DD National
 Religious broadcasting

Further reading

Notes

References

External links
 
Bible Ki Kahaniyan at Navodaya Studio

DD National original programming
1992 Indian television series debuts
1993 Indian television series endings
1996 Indian television series debuts
1996 Indian television series endings
Ancient Mesopotamia in popular culture
Ancient Near East in popular culture
Cultural depictions of Abraham
Cultural depictions of Adam and Eve
Cultural depictions of Cain and Abel
Cultural depictions of the Devil
Cultural depictions of Isaac
Cultural depictions of Joseph (Genesis)
Cultural depictions of Noah
Esau
Indian anthology television series
Indian period television series
Hindi-language television shows
Lot (biblical person)
Noah's Ark in television
Sodom and Gomorrah
Television series based on the Bible
Television shows set in Palestine
Television shows set in ancient Egypt
Tower of Babel
Works set in Mesopotamia
Christian mass media in India